The Kinglake National Park is a national park in Central Victoria, Australia.

The national park includes Masons Falls, a picnic area with falls and natural flora. Layered sediment forms the valley, containing fossils from when the area was once covered by the sea.  Natural fauna includes wallaby, kangaroo, wombat, possum and echidna. It also includes varieties of birds including cockatoos (sulphur-crested, black and red-headed), king parrots, the rosella and the lyrebird.

Prior to the 2009 Black Saturday bushfires, the park was renowned for being home to the tallest tree in Victoria. It was located in the Wallaby Creek closed catchment area in the north-west regions of the park.

History
The area was logged in the early part of the 20th century, and some remnants of logging remain (such as scars on some trees and a sawdust dump).

In January 2006, parts of the park to the north of the  township were devastated by a bushfire started by lightning during a severe thunderstorm. The blaze threatened to engulf the town, advancing to within a few hundred metres of the northern fringe. The town was saved by further thunderstorms, along with Country Fire Authority volunteers. In 2009 98% of the national park was severely burnt by the devastating Black Saturday bushfires. Much of the town of Kinglake was destroyed and nearly a hundred people died. As of 2010, rehabilitation work is continuing and sections of the park are gradually being reopened.

Books on Kinglake National Park 
Stewart, Kath and Hawkins, Deidre Living with Fire: A brief history of fires in the Kinglake Ranges, Kinglake, Vic. Kinglake Historical Society

See also

 Protected areas of Victoria
 Disappointment Reference Area
 Toorourrong Reservoir

References

National parks of Victoria (Australia)
Protected areas established in 1928
Forests of Victoria (Australia)
1928 establishments in Australia